Diamonds is the eighth studio album by Japanese pop band Deen. It was released on 18 August 2006 under BMG Funhouse.

Background
From this album they moved from sub-label to main label, BMG Japan. The release gasp between previous album Road Cruisin' are two years.

The album consists of two previously released singles, Starting Over and Diamond.

For the first time the composer Kouji Yamane will perform by himself his own written song Shanghai Rock Star. For the first time after eight years, some staff from Being Inc. were involved in album production, such as Tetsurō Oda and Takeshi Hayama.

This album was released in two formats: regular CD edition and limited CD+DVD edition. In DVD disc are included making videoclips of the singles "Diamond".

Charting performance
The album reached #20 in its first week and charted for 3 weeks, selling 10,000 copies.

Track listing

In media
Starting Over - ending theme for Nihon TV program Itadaki Muscle!
Diamonds - image song for Chiba Lotte Marines
Niji no Kanate e - commercial song for Joguchi Atom

References

Sony Music albums
Japanese-language albums
2006 albums
Deen (band) albums